Herbert Francis (May 26, 1940 – September 20, 1988) was an American cyclist. He competed in the sprint event at the 1960 Summer Olympics.

References

External links
 

1940 births
1988 deaths
American male cyclists
Olympic cyclists of the United States
Cyclists at the 1960 Summer Olympics
Sportspeople from Miami